Justice Flynn may refer to:

Edmund W. Flynn (1890–1957), chief justice of the Rhode Island Supreme Court
Meagan Flynn (born 1967), associate justice of the Oregon Supreme Court